The Swedish Export Credit Corporation is a state-owned corporation that serves as an export credit agency. It provides medium- and long-term export credits. It works with the Ministry of Finance.

See also
National Export Credits Guarantee Board (Sweden)

References

External links

Export credit agencies
Foreign trade of Sweden